Gertrud Herrbruck (27 July 1926 – 7 June 2021) was a German backstroke swimmer who won a silver medal in the 100 m backstroke at the 1950 European Aquatics Championships. She also participated in the 1952 Summer Olympics and finished sixth in the same event. She won several German Championships. She was born in Pirmasens in July 1926 and died in June 2021 at the age of 94.

References

1926 births
2021 deaths
European Aquatics Championships medalists in swimming
German female backstroke swimmers
German female swimmers
Olympic swimmers of Germany
People from Pirmasens
Swimmers at the 1952 Summer Olympics
Sportspeople from Rhineland-Palatinate
20th-century German women
21st-century German women